The Fredericksburg Historic District is located in Fredericksburg, Texas in Gillespie County. It was added to the National Register of Historic Places in Texas on October 14, 1970  The district area coincides with the original platting of the town by Herman Wilke, and the streets are laid out in a wide grid. The district is bordered approximately on the north by Schubert Street and the south by Creek Street, on the west by Acorn Street and the east by Elk Street. It encompasses one contributing object (sculpture of John O. Meusebach), 367 contributing buildings and 191 non-contributing buildings. Many of the buildings in the historic district have been designated either a Recorded Texas Historic Landmark, and/or added to the National Register of Historic Places listings in Texas.

See also

History of Fredericksburg, Texas
Architecture of Fredericksburg, Texas
National Museum of the Pacific War
List of museums in the Texas Hill Country
National Register of Historic Places listings in Gillespie County, Texas
Recorded Texas Historic Landmarks in Gillespie County

References

External links

Geography of Gillespie County, Texas
National Register of Historic Places in Gillespie County, Texas
Historic districts on the National Register of Historic Places in Texas
Fredericksburg, Texas